Torquigener randalli, commonly known as Randall's puffer, is a fish of the pufferfish family Tetraodontidae native to the waters around Hawaii.

References

Randall's puffer
Fish of Hawaii
Randall's puffer